This was the first edition of the tournament.

Guido Andreozzi and Guillermo Durán won the title after defeating Karol Drzewiecki and Jakub Paul 6–3, 6–2 in the final.

Seeds

Draw

References

External links
 Main draw

Challenger Rio de Janeiro - Doubles